Happyland Higher Secondary School (HHSS) is a boarding school in Rajbiraj, Nepal. The school was established in 1979. The founder of the school is Punya Sitaula. It is the second private school established in Rajbiraj Municipality. The school has around 1700 students.

Academics
There are two courses of study in HHSS:

 School Leaving Certificate (SLC) (a nationwide curriculum up to class 10 prescribed by the Department of Education of Nepal) and
 10+2 Level (Higher Secondary Education Board of Nepal, equivalent alternative to A-Level).

Management Committee

References

See also 
 List of educational institutions in Rajbiraj

Boarding schools in Nepal
Educational institutions established in 1979
1980 establishments in Nepal